Jubie Barton Bragg (February 17, 1876 – November 26, 1947) was an American football coach and college athletic administrator.  He was the first head football coach at Florida A&M University in Tallahassee, Florida. Bragg coached the team off and on from 1907 through 1930 and has also served as head coach of Alabama's Talladega College, leading that school to shared black college football national championships in 1920 and 1921. His son, Eugene J. Bragg, was head football coach at Florida A&M from 1934 to 1935. Bragg was a charter member of Alpha Phi Alpha fraternity's Beta Nu chapter on the campus of Florida A&M.

Bragg died on November 26, 1947, in Tallahassee. Florida A&M's football stadium, Bragg Memorial Stadium, is named in his honor.

References

1876 births
1947 deaths
Florida A&M Rattlers and Lady Rattlers athletic directors
Florida A&M Rattlers football coaches
Jackson State Tigers football coaches
Talladega Tornadoes football coaches